Monte San Petrone is a mountain in the department of Haute-Corse on the island of Corsica, France.
It is the highest mountain in the Monte San Petrone massif, the southernmost of the schist massifs of the northeast of the island.

Location

The Monte San Petrone is the highest peak in the Castagniccia region, named after the abundant sweet chestnut trees, in the northeast of Corsica.
It is bounded by the Golo valley to the north, the Tyrhanian Sea to the east, the Tavignano valley to the south and the central valley of Corse from Corte to Ponte Leccia in the east.
There are three ridges in the district running roughly north-south: the Mont Piano Maggiore ridge is in the west, the Monte San Pedrone ridge is in the center and is the main ridge of the region, and the eastern ridge includes Monte Negrine and Monte Castello d'Osani.

The peak marks the meeting point of the boundaries of the cantons of Saliceto to the northwest, Nocario to the northeast, Campana to the southeast and San-Lorenzo to the southwest.
The Statuette of San Petru is on the eastern slope of the mountain.
The village of Saliceto is to the west and Nocario is to the east.
The Fium'Alto river originates on the south of the mountain.

Physical

Hiking

Hikers can access Monte San Petrone in the spring, summer and autumn.
It may have snow cover in the winter.
The trail from Col de Prato on the D71 road mainly runs through beach and pine woods, which provide shade from the summer heat.
It may take a walker in good condition three hours to complete.

Gallery

Notes

Citations

Sources

Mountains of Haute-Corse